Márcio José Narciso (born January 21, 1981), known as Márcio Alemão, is a Brazilian footballer who most recently plays for Saipa in the Iran Pro League.

Club career
In 2009, Narciso played 17 games for Guarani Futebol Clube, scoring 1 goal. In 2010 he was transferred to Iran Pro League team Naft Tehran.  After playing all his career in Brazil. He is one of the key players for Naft in 2011-12 season.

References

1981 births
Living people
Brazilian footballers
Brazilian expatriate footballers
Expatriate footballers in Iran
Persian Gulf Pro League players
Naft Tehran F.C. players
Saipa F.C. players
Guarani FC players
Esporte Clube Noroeste players
Associação Desportiva Confiança players
Esporte Clube Juventude players
Ituano FC players
Ipatinga Futebol Clube players
Santa Cruz Futebol Clube players
Criciúma Esporte Clube players
Treze Futebol Clube players
Campinense Clube players
Association football defenders